Statistics of Úrvalsdeild in the 1968 season.

Overview
It was contested by 6 teams, and KR won the championship. Fram's Helgi Númason, ÍBA's Kári Árnason, KR's Ólafur Lárusson and Valur's Reynir Jónsson were the joint top scorers with 8 goals.

League standings

Results
Each team played every opponent once home and away for a total of 10 matches.

References

Úrvalsdeild karla (football) seasons
Iceland
Iceland
Urvalsdeild